Harberger Tax''' is a type of property tax that aims to improve societal welfare by optimising for both investment and allocative efficiency of private property. It proposes a new kind of “partial ownership”, halfway between private ownership and common ownership. The tax is implemented by two mechanisms;

 Owners periodically self-assess their property and pay tax on its value.
 Others are able to purchase the property from the owner at any time, forcing a sale.

First proposed by American economist Arnold Harberger, it was further popularised in Glen Weyl and Eric Posner’s book Radical Markets: Uprooting Capitalism and Democracy for a Just Society''.

References 

Property taxes